Tazeh Kand-e Jabal (also Romanized as Tāzeh Kand-e Jabal; also known as Tāzeh Kand-e Bolbol) is a village in Almahdi Rural District, Mohammadyar District, Naqadeh County, West Azerbaijan Province, Iran. At the 2006 census, its population was 377, in 90 families.

References 

Populated places in Naqadeh County